Triveniganj Assembly constituency is an assembly constituency in Supaul district in the Indian state of Bihar. It is reserved for scheduled castes. It was an open seat earlier.

Overview
Per Delimitation of Parliamentary and Assembly constituencies Order, 2008, No. 44 Triveniganj Assembly constituency (SC) is composed of the following: Triveniganj and Pratapganj community development blocks.

Triveniganj Assembly constituency is part of No. 8 Supaul (Lok Sabha constituency).

Members of Legislative Assembly

Election results

2020

References

External links
 

Assembly constituencies of Bihar
Politics of Supaul district